On Trust (foaled 1944 in California) was an American Thoroughbred racehorse whom the Bridgeport, Connecticut, Sunday Herald called "one of the most distinguished and durable performers to come out of the state of California."  His dam was Torch Rose and his sire was Alibhai, a British stallion who was imported by MGM Studios boss Louis B. Mayer to the United States to stand at his stud farm in Perris, California. On Trust was bred by Mayer, who raced him mid-way through his 1946 racing campaign, then sold the two-year-old to Earl Stice and his sons Rod and Gary, businessmen from Eagle Rock.

Trained by future U.S. Racing Hall of Fame inductee William Molter, On Trust earned his only win at age two in the California Homebred Stakes at Bay Meadows Racetrack.

Triple Crown races
When On Trust was three, Ralph Neves rode him to a victory in February 1947 Santa Maria Handicap
that put him on the path to that year's U.S. Triple Crown series. Following his win in the most prestigious race for three-year-olds on the West Coast, the Santa Anita Derby, On Trust was sent off as the bettors second choice in the Kentucky Derby but finished fourth to Jet Pilot in the 1947 Kentucky Derby and second to Faultless in the Preakness Stakes. He did not run in the third leg of the Triple Crown, the Belmont Stakes.

On Trust continued to compete at top levels into age six in 1950, a year when he equaled the Tanforan Racetrack track record of 1:50 3/5 for a mile and an eighth on dirt.

Stud record
On Trust retired from racing in January 1951 as California's leading money winner and sixth of all time in the United States. He was sent to stud duty at the Circle J. R. Ranch near Corona, California. He met with only limited success as a sire. Perhaps the best runner among his progeny was Trackmaster, winner of the 1955 California Derby and 1956 Santa Anita Maturity.

References

 On Trust's pedigree and partial racing stats

1944 racehorse births
Thoroughbred family A29
Racehorses bred in California
Racehorses trained in the United States